Nepenthes minima is a tropical pitcher plant native to Central Sulawesi, Indonesia. It grows in seasonally dry grasslands at elevations of 1000–1700 m above sea level, and has a number of adaptations to survive wildfires. It is the only pyrophytic Nepenthes species known from outside Indochina and the Philippines.

The specific epithet minima, Latin for "smallest", was chosen as an antonym to that of the closely allied N. maxima, with which this species was long conflated and from which it differs in being smaller in all respects. In 2009 this species was described as a cultivar from the area around Lake Poso in Central Sulawesi: Nepenthes maxima 'Lake Poso'.

References

Carnivorous plants of Asia
minima
Plants described in 2016
Taxa named by Martin Cheek
Taxa named by Matthew Jebb